The Vice Chief of Defence Force (VCDF) is a senior appointment in the New Zealand Defence Force. The position was established in February 2004 in response to the Review of Accountabilities and Structural Arrangements between the Ministry of Defence and the New Zealand Defence Force undertaken by Don Hunn (known as the "Hunn Review") and reported on in September 2002. Hunn recommended greater integration between top-level military and civil personnel responsible for the command and governance of the New Zealand Defence Force, and suggested the position of VCDF be created to assist the Chief of Defence Force as a chief staff officer.

The incumbent VCDF, Air Vice Marshal Tony Davies, was appointed to the position in September 2018.

Appointees

The following list chronologically records those who have held the post of VCDF, with rank and honours as at the completion of the individual's term.

References

Military of New Zealand